Walter Draeger (14 December 1888 – 24 January 1976 ) was a German composer and music educator. Er war Professor an der  and the Hochschule für Musik Franz Liszt, Weimar. In 1955, war er Mitinitiator der ersten Hallische Musiktage.

Life 
Draeger was born in 1888 as the son of a teacher and organist in Batzlow near Freienwalde in the Province of Brandenburg. Von 1908 bis 1913 studierte er Geschichte, Romance studies and musicology an der Friedrich-Wilhelms-Universität zu Berlin. In 1913, he was awarded his doctorate there with the dissertation Das alte lübische Stadtrecht und seine Quellen Die Referenten der Arbeit waren Dietrich Schäfer and Michael Tangl. During his studies, he spent two years in Grenoble and Paris (Sorbonne).

After the First World War, he was musically trained by Otto Taubmann at the Berlin University of the Arts and by Franz Schreker. It was only after 1945 that he emerged as a composer. From 1949 to 1952, he taught music theory and composition at the Quedlinburg Conservatory. From 1955 to 1963, he taught music theory and composition at the Hochschule für Musik Franz Liszt, Weimar. He retired in 1958.

In terms of composition, Draeger devoted himself in particular to instrumental music. On the one hand, he dealt with the Volkslied. On the other hand, a connection "to traditional genres as well as an inclination to classicist thinking and simple, transparent fracture" (Grützner 2004) can be recognised. The majority of his early works, however, were destroyed in his Berlin flat during the war in 1944. According to Gilbert Stöck, he "sometimes distanced himself critically from some of the dogmas of Socialist realism"; the composer pursued a neo-Romantic style.

In 1951, he was elected to the central committee of the Verband der Komponisten und Musikwissenschaftler der DDR (VDK). Außerdem war er Gründungs- und Vorstandsmitglied des Arbeitskreises Halle im VDK und als solcher neben Fritz Reuter, Walther Siegmund-Schultze, Gerhard Wohlgemuth und anderen einer der Initiatoren der 1955 veranstalteten 1. Hallische Musiktage. From 1956 to 1959, he served as the first chairman of the Thuringia district association of the VDK.

Draeger was married to Eva, née Hartmann, and was the father of a son. The composer died in Weimar at the age of 87.

Awards 
 1955: Kunstpreis der Stadt Halle (für den Liederkreis Doris und Damon)
 1970: Literatur- und Kunstpreis der Stadt Weimar
 Ehrennadel in Gold des Verbandes Deutscher Komponisten und Musikwissenschaftler
 Ehrenmitglied des Verbandes Deutscher Komponisten und Musikwissenschaftler

Work

Orchestral music 
 Sinfonietta for stringed instruments, 1947
 Sinfonie, 1957
 Ein ernstes Vorspiel, 1961
 Suite after motifs of the opera  In Schilda ist der Teufel los, 1962
 Suite for chamber string orchestra, 1962
 Temperaturen for 18 winds, harp and double bass, 1964
 Capriccio diabolico, 1972

Concertante music 
 for flute and string orchestra, 1931
 Kleines Lehrbuch der Zoologie for violin and small orchestra, 1937
 for piano and orchestra, 1952
 for violin and orchestra, 1956
 for violoncello and orchestra, 1961

Chamber music 
 Divertimento for violin and piano, 1940
 Introduction and Rondo for wind quartet, 1942
 Altdeutsche Tanz- und Liebeslieder for violin, viola and piano, 1942
 Quartet for wind instruments, 1947
 3 string quartets, 1951; 1957; 1969
 3 Miniatures for oboe and piano, 1956
 Concertino for 5 winds, 1962
 Rondo Vorwiegend Heiter for 5 winds after old German street calls and craft songs, 1963

Piano 
 Konzert für 2 Klaviere, 1950
 Quedlinburger Klavierbuch, 1950

Opera 
 In Schilda ist der Teufel los, 1959/62

Vocal music 
 Anacreontic Rhapsody for baritone and small orchestra, 1938
 Peasant Legends for male choir and wind orchestra, 1948
 Doris and Damon for soprano, oboe and orchestra, 1949
 Eternal Circle for soprano and orchestra, 1954
 Zwiegesang for soprano, violin and piano, 1957
 Love never ends for soprano and string quartet, 1960
 In memoriam for voice and chamber orchestra, 1967

Publications 
 Das alte lübische Stadtrecht und seine Quellen. In Hansische Geschichtsblätter 19 (1913), . (Berliner Dissertation, 1913)

Further reading 
 Paul Frank, Wilhelm Altmann: Kurzgefasstes Tonkünstler-Lexikon. Für Musiker und Freunde der Musik. Fortgeführt von Burchard Bulling, Florian Noetzel, Helmut Rösner. Second part: Ergänzungen und Erweiterungen seit 1937. Vo:lume 1: A–K. 15th edition, Heinrichshofen, Wilhelmshaven 1974, .
 Adrian Gaster (ed.): International Who's Who in Music and Musicians' Directory. 8th edition, Melrose Press, Cambridge 1977, .
 Vera Grützner: Musiker in Brandenburg vom 16. Jahrhundert bis zur Gegenwart. Jaron, Berlin 2004, pp. 52f.
 Walter Habel (ede.):  Das Deutsche Who's Who. 14h edition by Degeners Wer ist's? Arani, Berlin 1965, 
 Hans Rudolf Jung: Walter Draeger zum 75. Geburtstag. In Musik und Gesellschaft 13 (1963), pp. 742f.
 Horst Seeger: Musiklexikon. In zwei Bänden. Volume 1: A–K. Deutscher Verlag für Musik VEB, Leipzig 1966, .
 Verband Deutscher Komponisten und Musikwissenschaftler, Musik-Informationszentrum (ed.): Komponisten und Musikwissenschaftler der Deutschen Demokratischen Republik. Kurzbiographien und Werkverzeichnisse. 2nd expended edition, Verlag Neue Musik, Berlin 1968, pp. 45f.

References

External links 
 
 
 Walter Draeger in der MusicSack-Datenbank

20th-century German composers
20th-century classical composers
German opera composers
Academic staff of the Hochschule für Musik Franz Liszt, Weimar
1888 births
1976 deaths
Musicians from Brandenburg